Archips silvicolanus is a moth of the family Tortricidae. It is found in Vietnam.

The wingspan is 23 mm. The ground colour of the forewings is brownish ferruginous, but ochreous in the tornal area, tinged and sprinkled with rust brown. The markings are dark rust brown. The hindwings are brownish with an orange apical area.

Etymology
The name refers to the habitat and is derived from Latin silva (meaning forest) and colanus (meaning collected).

References

Moths described in 2009
Archips
Moths of Asia
Taxa named by Józef Razowski